Saints of Valory is an American alternative rock band from Austin, Texas. The band is composed of Gavin Jasper (lead vocals/bass), Godfrey Thomson (guitar/vocals), and Stephen Buckle (keyboards/vocals). The band released their V EP on May 19, 2014. This was a follow up to the Possibilities EP, which released on July 9, 2013, via Atlantic Records. The debut EP features the single "Neon Eyes".

History 
The band was formed in 2008 in Rio de Janeiro, Brazil before relocating to Austin, Texas in 2010. Their origins are rooted in a childhood friendship between lead vocalist-bassist Gavin Jasper and Thomson, who met in Jasper's native Rio de Janeiro while their parents were working abroad. Jasper learned to play bass and joined a country-rock band, while Thomson launched his own band. In 2008, Jasper and Thomson reunited in Brazil, with Thomson bringing along his friend Gerard Labou, a young drummer from France. Calling themselves Saints of Valory (an reference to Labou's mother Valerie), the trio decided to form a band and took to MySpace to post their tracks, which attracted initial interest from independent labels. Needing a space to rehearse for a showcase, they contacted their friend Stephen Buckle, who had a small studio in his home in Boerne, Texas. Buckle was born in Greece to an American mother and Canadian father and spent most of his childhood in Thailand and Southeast Asia, but befriended Jasper during a four-year stint in Brazil. In April 2010, he joined the band full-time as a keyboardist.

After self-releasing their debut, The Bright Lights, in November 2010, featuring an early version of their track "Providence", the track entered the top 50 at Triple A radio, making the band the only unsigned artist to reach the upper tier of the chart. In May 2012, the band self-released their second EP, Kids, which entered iTunes' Top Rock Albums Chart, selling 1,700 copies in its first week.

Throughout 2011 the band performed at South by Southwest, CMJ, and DeLuna Festival.

Atlantic Records, Possibilities EP 
After being named one of Billboard's Top Unsigned Artists in 2012 the band announced their signing to Atlantic Records. The band's label debut Possibilities EP featuring the single "Neon Eyes" was released July 9, 2013 and was produced by Joe Chiccarelli and Saints of Valory.

"Neon Eyes" 
On July 24, 2013, the band premiered the music video for the single "Neon Eyes" on Billboard. The video was also featured on MTV's Buzzworthy.

Members
Current
Stephen Buckle (keyboards/vocals)
Godfrey Thomson (guitar/vocals)
Gavin Jasper (lead vocals/bass)

Former
Gerard Labou (drums)

Discography

Albums

Extended plays

Singles

Guest appearances

References 

2008 establishments in Brazil
Alternative rock groups from Texas
Atlantic Records artists
Musical groups established in 2008
Musical quartets